The Chartered Institute of Housing (CIH) is the professional body for those working in the housing profession in the United Kingdom. It has a royal charter, gained in 1984. Currently CIH has over 17,000 members, mostly in the UK but also overseas, notably in Hong Kong. CIH's current Chief Executive is Gavin Smart.

History

The CIH traces its organisational roots back to the philanthropic work carried out by pioneers such as Octavia Hill, in response to the revelation of the appalling housing conditions endured by much of the population in the 1884-1885 Royal Commission on the Housing of Working Classes.  Hill established a method of letting properties on short-term tenancies and trained a group of women to manage the properties by collecting rents and dealing with repairs and tenants' welfare issues.  The Association of Women Housing Workers, founded in 1916, carried on this pioneering work and housing advocate Irene Barclay was a leading figure in it.  The organisation changed its name to the Society of Housing Managers in 1948.

The Institute of Housing was founded in 1931 by a group of local government offices in the West Midlands, who also developed a housing qualification and published the first edition of Housing magazine.

The two merged in 1965 to form the Institute of Housing Managers. The organisation was renamed the Institute of Housing in 1974 and gained the appellation "Chartered" when its royal charter was granted in 1984.  In 1999, CIH merged with the Institute of Rent Officers.

CIH Today

CIH’s Head Office is in Coventry, West Midlands, with smaller offices in London, Cardiff, Edinburgh and Belfast, and overseas offices in Hong Kong and Toronto.  Alongside its services to members it produces training, publications, conferences and seminars to organisations, members and non-members.  CIH works with universities to develop housing qualifications, and provides distance learning courses.

CIH’s annual conference is held every June, moving to Manchester from 2012 following several years of being held in Harrogate.  The conference includes an extensive exhibition and also hosts CIH’s AGM.

References

External links
Chartered Institute of Housing

Housing
Public housing in the United Kingdom
Housing in the United Kingdom
1916 establishments in the United Kingdom
1931 establishments in the United Kingdom
Housing rights organizations
Organisations based in Coventry